Malvaviscus is a genus of flowering plants in the mallow family, Malvaceae. Common names for species in this genus include Turk's cap mallow, wax mallow, sleeping hibiscus, and mazapan. It belongs to a group of genera that differ from the closely related Hibiscus in possessing a fruit divided into 5 separate parts (a schizocarp), and having a style surmounted by 10, rather than 5, capitate or capitellate stigmas. Among those genera Malvaviscus is distinguished by having auriculate petals and red, fleshy fruits.
The generic name is derived from the Latin words malva, meaning "mallow," and viscus, which means "sticky," referring to the mucilaginous sap produced by members of the genus.
The fruit can be used to make jelly or syrup. Both the fruit and flowers are used to make herbal teas.

Selected species
 Malvaviscus achanioides (Turcz.) Fryxell
 Malvaviscus arboreus Cav. (Southeastern United States, Mexico, Central and South America)
 Malvaviscus arboreus var. arboreus
 Malvaviscus arboreus var. drummondii (Torr. & A.Gray) Schery (= Malvaviscus drummondii Torr. & A.Gray)
 Malvaviscus arboreus var. mexicanus Schltdl.
 Malvaviscus concinnus Medik.
 Malvaviscus conzattii Greenm.
 Malvaviscus palmanus Pittier & Donn.Sm. (Costa Rica)
  DC. (=M. arboreus var. penduliflorus (DC.) Schery) 
 Malvaviscus williamsii Ulbr.

References

External links

 

 
Malvaceae genera